Daewon University College is a private technical college in North Chungcheong province, South Korea.  The campus is situated in Jecheon City.  About 85 instructors are employed.   Around 2,000 students are admitted every year.

Academics

The academic offerings of Daewon University College are provided through the divisions of Engineering, Health & Social Affairs, Household Affairs, Humanities & Social Sciences, and Arts & Physical Education.  The majority of offerings are through the division of Engineering, which includes fields such as automotive engineering and multimedia.

History

The college was founded in 1995 as Daewon Junior College (대원전문대학).  It took its current name in 1999.

See also
List of colleges and universities in South Korea
Education in South Korea

External links
Official school website, in English and Korean

Universities and colleges in North Chungcheong Province
1995 establishments in South Korea
Educational institutions established in 1995